In Greek mythology, Podarge (English translation: "fleet-foot") referred to several different beings.

One of the Harpies is named Podarge and, due to her union with Zephyrus, the god of the West Wind, was the mother of Balius and Xanthus, the horses of Achilles.
The rainbow/messenger goddess Iris (sister of the Harpies) is sometimes also referred to as Podarge.
Podarces was Priam's birth name.  He changed it after buying his life from Heracles with a golden veil embroidered by his sister, Hesione.  Priam was interpreted as "ransomed" (as if from πρίασθαι "to have bought") by folk etymology.

Greek legendary creatures
Legendary birds
Harpies
Mythological hybrids